Marian Blaj (born 11 March 1978) is a Romanian biathlete. He competed at the 2002 Winter Olympics and the 2006 Winter Olympics.

References

1978 births
Living people
Romanian male biathletes
Olympic biathletes of Romania
Biathletes at the 2002 Winter Olympics
Biathletes at the 2006 Winter Olympics
People from Bran, Brașov